Postoak (see also Post Oak, Post Oak Springs) is an unincorporated community in Roane County, Tennessee, United States.

Notable people
Joshua Berkey, politician, newspaper editor, and Christian minister, was born in Post Oak Springs, in Roane County.

Notes

Unincorporated communities in Roane County, Tennessee
Unincorporated communities in Tennessee